The longleaf pine ecosystem is a climax savanna habitat found within the Southern United States; it includes many rare plant and animal species, and is one of the most biodiverse in North America. Once the largest ecosystem in North America, it now occupies less than a quarter of the original range. Degradation of the ecosystem is partially due to excessive timber harvesting, urbanization, and fire exclusion. Although the ecosystem is heavily fragmented at present, it still carries a great diversity of plant and animal species, many of which are endemic. A range of techniques, including planting longleaf pine seedlings, introducing prescribed burning regimens, managing native ground cover, and controlling invasive species within the ecosystem, are used in attempting to preserve this threatened ecosystem.

Original range

During the Ice Age, when the North American continental glaciers extended as far south as parts of the Ohio River, the climate was colder and drier; longleaf pine and associated species grew in coastal regions away from the ice, from Florida to Mexico. During the Holocene, the ice retreated, the climate became warm and dry, and the longleaf pine ecosystem established itself in its historical range.

The longleaf pine ecosystem was first described in the early 1500s by the Spaniard Hernando de Soto, and in accounts by Native Americans recorded in journals of European explorers as well.
The ecosystem extended from southeastern Virginia down to northern Florida over to eastern Texas, forming the dominant land cover in the coastal plain of these states. 
There is some doubt about the original extent due to lack of systematic data from the coastal regions of Florida to Mexico. There is, however, extensive literature from various explorers of southeastern North America dating as far back as 1608, when Captain John Smith recorded his accounts of the forest and the first exports of products from pines close to the new settlement in Jamestown, Virginia.

Role of fire

The longleaf pine ecosystem is a fire climax community, that is "a plant and animal community that is limited by and adapted to an early successional stage by frequent fire disturbances". Fire destroys other pine species and hardwoods which would outcompete the longleaf pines. 

Before Euroamericans established themselves in the area, Native Americans set fires regularly in order to encourage the growth of plants eaten by game animals and to clear undergrowth for ease of occupation and movement in the forest. Wildfire, ignited by lightning from summer thunderstorms, also played a role in the ecosystem. Once lit by humans or lightning, fires burned across the landscape for days, weeks, and even months due to the lack of habitat fragmentation by roads, railroads, or cities.

Animal and plant diversity

The longleaf pine ecosystem is one of the richest habitats in North America, and its forest floor is one of the most diverse of its kind in the world. As of 2001, there are an estimated 27 federal endangered species and 100 species of concern that reside in the ecosystem. Some of the species in this ecosystem have limited range due to topography and climate of some regions of the system. The most notable species of the ecosystem are the longleaf pine, wiregrass, and red-cockaded woodpecker, all of which were found throughout the historic range. The longleaf pine is most notable for thick bark, which aids in the resistant to fire and to southern pine beetle outbreaks.

The grass species Carolina wiregrass (Aristida stricta), which is found in the northern portion, and southern wiregrass (Aristida beyrichiana), which is found in the southern portion, are the dominant grass species of the habitat. These wiregrass species play a key role in the reproduction and spread of the longleaf pine, as they help to carry fire across the land.

The red-cockaded woodpecker (Picoides borealis) was once a common inhabitant of this habitat, but since the decline of the ecosystem it has been placed on the federal endangered species list. In males, a red strip atop the head is only visible when young or up close. This woodpecker carefully selects longleaf pine, or associated pine species of the area, for heart rot disease. Once a tree is selected, excavation of a cavity is achieved usually taking 2 years to complete.

Embedded within the longleaf pine ecosystem are countless varieties of microhabitats. Among the more unique of these habitats are pitcher plant bogs. Pitcher plants and their companion plants are specialized to exist in a narrow set of conditions. Soil moisture is critical and many "bog" communities are actually the result of a hard, impermeable clay layer beneath porous sand. Rainwater seeps through the sand but runs into a clay layer where it is either trapped (like a pool) or seeps out the side of a hill. These nutrient-poor, moist sites are ideal for the carnivorous pitcher plants. Bogs common to many "flatwood" longleaf areas are called "wet prairies" while other bogs found on hillsides are called "seepage slopes". The transition from forest to an open bog is not immediate. Forests usually grade into a wetland bog habitat. This transition area is called an ecotone and hosts a rich variety of plant and animal species. 
 
Pitcher plants have modified leaves shaped into hollow tubes (that look like a water pitcher), which attract insects. Downward pointing hairs and slippery walls make escape difficult and the insects are dissolved and digested by enzymes in the bottom of the pitcher. Other plants trap small insects on flat sticky leaves before slowly digesting them.
Several types of pitcher plants as well as other carnivorous plants grow in the longleaf pine ecosystem.  Species include the hooded pitcher plant, trumpet pitcher plant, white-topped pitcher plant, and parrot pitcher plant. Other bog plants include colic-root; goldcrest; meadow-beauty (also called deerflower); white-topped sedge; orange milkwort (also called "bog Cheetos" because of their resemblance to the snack brand); bog-buttons (also called "hatpins"); several species of orchids; and many other wildflowers. Both soil moisture conditions and full sun are critical to these plants. Most of these bog plants have little shade tolerance. Pitcher plant bogs are fire dependent habitats. The frequent fires common to the longleaf ecosystem keep woody shrubs from encroaching on bogs. Without fire, moisture-loving shrubs invade drying up bogs and shading out the herbaceous plants. 
 
Despite the longleaf pine ecosystem's heavy endangerment and degradation, new species are still being described from it due to its heavy biodiversity. In 2018, one of the world's largest salamanders, the reticulated siren, was described from wetlands in the longleaf pine ecosystem along the Gulf Coastal Plain.

Decline

The decline of the ecosystem proceeded slowly at first, as the Native American population declined (largely due to spread of Old World epidemic diseases) and with it deliberately set fires.  European settlers in turn gradually began using fire as a management tool, similar to existing traditions in England, Scotland, and Ireland. Introduction of the razorback hog (Sus scrofa scrofa) caused considerable damage to plants, including longleaf pine seedlings.

Over the 17th and 18th centuries exploitation and clearing of the forest increased.  Small living quarters such as log cabins were built using longleaf pine logs. As the tree made good lumber it was soon being exported.  Longleaf pine resin was extracted for production of naval stores. To obtain the resin from the live longleaf pine, pioneers first cut and removed wood exposing a deep cavity, called a box at the base of the tree. Next a medium-sized, V-shaped cut was performed, above the box to start the resin flow into the box. As resin flowed into the box, it was collected and placed in barrels for shipment. Years afterward the tree itself would become weak and sensitive to wind storms.

Roads and railroads were constructed in various locations throughout the southeast beginning in the 1800s for transportation and forest harvesting, which together with settlement building caused habitat fragmentation in the ecosystem.

After the Civil War in 1865, the agriculture boom started. Many pioneers had received word about the cash crop cotton, soon land purchase and the clearing of land increased significantly. With this sudden shift in land use, the additions of large plantations were established in the ecosystem, as well. In result of this boom plus the addition of forest harvesting and transportation right of ways, further habitat loss was increasing at an alarming rate.

During the early 1900s, more habitat lost was due to World War I. Vast acres of the longleaf pine in the southeast were cleared to aid in ship building for the war effort.  With this push in demand, 1909 marked the peak of longleaf pine lumber production. At this period, it was realized that decline in the ecosystem was eminent through the bare landscape with little regeneration of longleaf pine. So to compensate for loss, replanting of some clear-cuts areas in the ecosystem was planted by land owners and Civilian Conservation Corps enrollees during the Great Depression era of the mid 1900s. Although in some sectors of landowners in the southeast learned over the years that the longleaf pine was a slow growing tree, and thus began replanting the ecosystem with faster growing trees species like slash and loblolly pines. With this replanting, faster tree growth and greater lumber production was achieved.

As of 2011, only  or so of the longleaf pine ecosystem are left in North America. This significant drop in the ecosystem acreage marks a 97 percent decrease. In overlook of the ecosystem,  today, it is described as being patchy and uneven in the distribution across the landscape. Of the now 3 percent ecosystem acreage, there are a documented  of old growth longleaf pine stands left.

Concern of the ecosystem today

In the past, the first concerns of the longleaf pine ecosystem were brought to attention in the early 1900s. These concerns were primarily focused on regeneration of harvested longleaf pine stands and remaining pine stands in the ecosystem. Men like Henry E. Hardtner and Herman H. Chapman were among the first to collaborate ways to implement longleaf regeneration in the ecosystem. Later the United States Forest Service recognized and had studied the need of fire in the ecosystem burning (man-lit fire) was implemented on national forest.

The major concerns for the longleaf pine ecosystem in the 21st century are urbanization and fire suppression. With the North American population increasing by roughly 2.5 million people a year, the competition for space is increasing. Threat to the longleaf pine ecosystem is emanate through land clearing for commercial businesses and housing developments.  Fire suppression is also ultimately caused by development, because the increase in the wildland-urban interface results in increased human endangerment from wildfires and an increased incentive to suppress them.  The habitat fragmentation resulting from development has also precluded the large-scale wildfires which historically maintained the ecosystem.  The lack of fire in the remaining ecosystem has resulted in its further deterioration. In result, the federal government and state government agencies in Alabama, Florida, Georgia, Louisiana, Mississippi, North Carolina, South Carolina, Texas, and Virginia have teamed up to provide aid to this critical ecosystem. This aid comes in the form of cost share programs, set up by states to assist private land owners in education, financial aid, and guidance on the longleaf pine ecosystem restoration.

References

Ecoregions of the United States